Kim Gwong-hyong (born 1 March 1946) is a Korean former wrestler who competed in the 1972 Summer Olympics.

References

External links
 

1946 births
Living people
Olympic wrestlers of North Korea
Wrestlers at the 1972 Summer Olympics
North Korean male sport wrestlers
Olympic bronze medalists for North Korea
Olympic medalists in wrestling
Medalists at the 1972 Summer Olympics
20th-century North Korean people